Catapaecilma evansi  is a species of butterfly belonging to the lycaenid family described by Henry Maurice Pendlebury in 1933. It is found in  Southeast Asia (Peninsular Malaya, Nias).

Subspecies
Catapaecilma evansi evansi (Malay Peninsula)
Catapaecilma evansi parva H. Schröder & Treadaway, 1988 (Philippines: northern Negros)
Catapaecilma evansi rizali Takanami, 1984 (Philippines: Mindanao)
Catapaecilma evansi shizukoae H. Hayashi, 1984 (Nias)

References

External links
 "Catapaecilma Butler, 1879" at Markku Savela's Lepidoptera and Some Other Life Forms

Catapaecilma
Butterflies described in 1933